, sometimes , is a yōkai, or Japanese monster, composed of smoke and darkness. It was first featured in the Konjaku Hyakki Shūi, circa 1781.

Mythology
Enenras mostly reside in bonfires; when they emerge, they take human shape or form. It is said that an enenra can only be seen by the pure of heart.

Enenras are mostly considered to be demons or divine beings of darkness and smoke; legend says that there are two types of enenras, the first and most common type being enenras who are born purely as enenras, whilst the second and more rarely occurring type are humans who have died and been transformed into enenras.

Popular culture
In the 2011 video game Mortal Kombat, the character Smoke (who makes his first human appearance in the game in almost two decades) is an enenra.

In the 2012 manga Forbidden Scrollery from the Touhou Project series, Enenra is featured as an evil yōkai that gets exterminated by the series's heroine.

In the 2020 video game Nioh 2, Enenra is featured as one of the game's many yōkai bosses.

References

Yōkai
Mythological monsters